Gregory Delawie  (born 1957) is a United States diplomat. From mid-2015 to mid-2018, he was the US Ambassador to Kosovo. Previously served as the Deputy Assistant Secretary for Verification, Planning, and European Security in the State Department's Bureau of Arms Control, Verification and Compliance. He also served as Deputy Chief of Mission, U.S. Embassy Embassy Zagreb, Croatia and Berlin, Germany

Personal life
Greg Delawie is originally from San Diego, California, and is the son of Homer Delawie. He is married to Vonda Kimble Delawie, a retired Foreign Service Officer. The couple have two children. Delawie  speaks German, Italian, Turkish and Croatian.

See also
Ambassadors of the United States

References

1957 births
Living people
Ambassadors of the United States to Kosovo
Harvard College alumni
United States Foreign Service personnel
21st-century American diplomats